Lake Pinamaloy is a freshwater lake located in the municipality of Don Carlos in the province of Bukidnon of Mindanao in the Philippines. The lake is fed by local run-off and is the main source of potable water for the municipality as well as its main tourist attraction.

References

External links
 Geographic data related to Lake Pinamaloy at OpenStreetMap

Pinamaloy
Landforms of Bukidnon